Vinnie & Bobby is an American television sitcom that aired on Fox from May 30 to September 5, 1992. The series is a spin-off of the 1991 sitcom Top of the Heap, which was itself a spin-off of Married... with Children. Series star Matt LeBlanc played the character of Vinnie Verducci on all three shows, as did Joey Lauren Adams as Mona Mullins, although she only appeared in the backdoor pilot of the Married... with Children episode.

As of November 2020, Canadian residents can stream the series on CTV's website.

Premise
Set in Chicago, Illinois, the series centers on Vinnie Verducci (Matt LeBlanc), a construction worker, and his roommate, Bobby Grazzo (Robert Torti) who share the same apartment Vinnie and his father once shared. Vinnie's father Charlie (Joseph Bologna) has apparently moved away, Vinnie's cat Mr. Fluffy has disappeared, and Bobby is moving his way in and has gotten Vinnie a job at a construction site. Others shown were Mona Mullins (Joey Lauren Adams), their 17-year-old neighbor, who still has a crush on Vinnie and is repulsed by her new neighbor Bobby. Other characters include fellow construction workers Bill Belli (John Pinette), Stanley (Ron Taylor) and Fred Slacker (Fred Stoller). One theme this show added to its predecessor is at the end of two episodes, the cast would begin an a cappella rendition of a song; for example, in episode 5 Vinnie, Bobby, Bill, Stanley and Fred begin to sing "Get a Job" by The Silhouettes before the end credits roll.

Cast
 Note: This table counts the pilot of Top of the Heap, and the same-titled episode of Married... with Children as two different episodes. Without this change, Mona Mullins would not be in any Married... with Children episodes and Vinnie Verducci would be in two ("Old Ones But Young'ns" and "Kelly Takes Hollywood: Part 1").

Episodes

References

External links

1990s American sitcoms
1992 American television series debuts
1992 American television series endings
American television spin-offs
Articles containing video clips
English-language television shows
Fictional duos
Fox Broadcasting Company original programming
Television duos
Television series by Sony Pictures Television
Television shows set in Chicago
Television series created by Ron Leavitt